Antonio Brack's Oldfield mouse (Thomasomys antoniobracki) is a species of sigmodontine rodent in the family Cricetidae known from Peru. The species is named after Peruvian ecologist Antonio Brack Egg.

See also
 List of mammals of Peru

References

Thomasomys
Endemic fauna of Peru
Mammals of Peru
Mammals described in 2021